Le Visage nuptial (The Nuptial Face) is a secular cantata for soprano, contralto, choir of women and orchestra by Pierre Boulez. Originally composed in 1946–47 on a poem by René Char for two voices, two ondes Martenot, piano and percussion, the work, revised in 1951–52 in a version for voices and orchestra, was premiered on 4 December 1957 in Cologne conducted by the composer. The score was further revised in 1989, removing the quarter tones present in the second and fifth parts of the 1951–52 version, while revising the orchestration. A version with final revisions by the composer was premiered on 25 February 2014 at the Cité de la Musique in Paris during the closing concert of the festival Présences of Radio France.

Instrumentation 
The piece is scored for soprano solo, alto solo, women's choir, and an orchestra consisting of nine percussionists:

Woodwinds
4 flutes (3rd doubling piccolo, 4th doubling on G flute)
3 oboes
English horn
3 clarinets (1st and 2nd in B and A, 3rd in E and A)
bass clarinet in B
4 bassoons (4th doubling contrabassoon)
Brass
4 horns
4 trumpets in C
3 trombones (3rd doubling bass trombone)
Tuba

Percussion
timbales
9 players (see below)
Keyboards
celesta
Strings
2 harps
16 violins I
14 violins II
12 violas
10 cellos
8 double basses

The  parts are as follows:
Percussion 1
xylophone, sounding an octave lower
glockenspiel, sounding two octaves lower
Japanese wood blocks
pair of crotales, sounding an E5
Percussion 2
marimba
2 claves (medium and high)
Turkish cymbal, suspended (medium)
pair of crotales, sounding a B4
Percussion 3
vibraphone
Percussion 4
set of cowbells, ranged G3 to A5
3 tom-toms
2 Turkish cymbals, suspended (medium, medium-high, and low)
Chinese cymbal, suspended
Sizzle cymbal, suspended
claves (low)
2 maracas (medium)
pair of crotales, sounding a B5
Percussion 5
set of steel drums, ranged G3 to B5
2 maracas
güiro
2 Japanese wood blocks
slit wood drum
bass drum
triangle
gong (medium-low)
tam-tam (large)
pair of crotales, sounding an A4

Percussion 6
glockenspiel
4 metal blocks
claves
whip
güiro
2 maracas
Turkish cymbal, suspended
2 gongs, sounding B3 and C4
tam-tam (large, same as Percussion 5)
pair of crotales, sounding a D5
Percussion 7
set of crotales (2 octaves)
crotale, sounding an E4
2 frame drums
3 Japanese wood blocks
güiro
whip
gong (medium)
2 tam-tams (medium and large)
Percussion 8
tubular bells (2 octaves)
snare drum (without snare)
2 conga drums
claves
güiro
large triangle
2 anvils, medium and large
2 gongs, high
tam-tam, medium
pair of crotales, sounding an F5
Percussion 9
4 bongo drums
2 maracas
2 Turkish cymbals, suspended (high, low)
large sizzle cymbal
2 bell plates, sounding B3 and C4
pair of crotales, sounding a C5

Structure 

The performance's duration is twenty minutes.

References

External links 
 
 Le Visage nuptial, Music Sales Classical
 "Pierre Boulez: les traits messins de son Visage nuptial", Le Républicain Lorrain (7 January 2016)
 "Le Visage nuptial de Pierre Boulez, dernière version 2014", Classicalnews.com
 

Compositions by Pierre Boulez
Cantatas
20th-century classical music
Music based on poems